Bertramka is a villa in Prague notable because of possible visits by Mozart. Now it is a museum dedicated to the memory of Mozart and to the former owners and Mozart’s hosts: František and Josefina Dušek.

Background 
It is little known that Mozart's purported visits to the Bertramka are actually very scantily documented. No contemporary observer ever reported seeing him there, and Mozart himself never claimed to have stayed there in any of his surviving correspondence from Prague. There is furthermore no reliable documentary basis to support widespread assertions that Mozart completed the operas Don Giovanni and La clemenza di Tito at the Bertramka, or indeed ever even worked on them there.  Claims of frequent visits are not recorded before the nineteenth century. For his first visit to Prague (in January and February 1787), Mozart is only recorded to have stayed in the palace of Count Johann Joseph Franz von Thun-Hohenstein in Malá Strana. For the other two extended visits (October to November 1787 and August to September 1791), it is difficult to see how continuous residence at the Bertramka would have been practical for Mozart, since it was located far outside the city walls of Prague at the time, and it would have been necessary to "commute" daily into the city by some sort of conveyance in order to participate in the musical commitments that were expected of him.  Only occasional visits are likely.  The best evidence that he ever stayed there at all (and only during his second visit to Prague in October and November 1787) comes from his son Karl Thomas Mozart in a reminiscence of 1856. Karl Thomas was not present for the incident reported, rather only heard about it from friends of Mozart he met in Prague as a boy in the 1790s.

See also 
 List of music museums

References

Official brochure of Comenius, Society for Culture and Education
Freeman, Daniel E. Mozart in Prague. Minneapolis, 2013.  ; new revised edition published by Calumet Editions in 2021, ISBN  1950743500
“Mozart and Prague” by Harald Salfellner, Vitalis 2003; 
Libin, Kathryn I., "Bertramka Returns to the Czech Mozart Society," Mozart Society of America, Friends of Bertramka

External links
Bertramka Mozart Society (English/German version)
Mozart Society of America, Friends of Bertramka

Houses completed in the 18th century
Museums in Prague
Wolfgang Amadeus Mozart
Music museums in the Czech Republic
Biographical museums in the Czech Republic
Music organizations based in the Czech Republic
Smíchov